A Discretionary Housing Payment''' is a discretionary and short-term payment made in the United Kingdom that helps people with their housing costs  To get a Discretionary Housing Payment a person must be in receipt of Housing Benefit or Universal Credit.  Application is to the Local Authority.  Central-government regulations and guidance require each Local Authority to make decisions on a case-by-case basis but also to have a policy.

A similar Exceptional Hardship Payment exists.

References

External links
     Government webpage   (Accessed Aug 2019)
     DWP: Discretionary Housing Payments Guidance Manual Including Local Authority Good Practice Guide August 2019    (Accessed Aug 2019)

Housing in the United Kingdom
Welfare in the United Kingdom